Menegazzia is a genus of lichenized fungi containing roughly 70 accepted species. The group is sometimes referred to as the tree flutes, honeycombed lichens, or hole-punch lichens.  The most obvious morphological feature of the genus is the distinctive perforations spread across the upper side of the thallus. This makes the group easy to recognise, even for those not particularly familiar with lichen identification.

The genus has a sub-cosmopolitan distribution (excluding Antarctica), but is concentrated in Australasia, Melanesia, and southern South America.  Most species grow exclusively on trees, but some grow on rocks, moss, and/or soil.

Etymology
Menegazzia was described by the Veronese lichenologist Abramo Massalongo in 1854. He named it after his friend Luigi Menegazzi (1795-1854), who was a naturalist.

Taxonomy
Placement of Menegazzia within the Parmeliaceae has now been confirmed by several molecular studies.  However, the exact position of the genus within the Parmeliaceae remains uncertain.  It is unplaced within the Parmeliaceae. Previously, the morphologically similar genus Hypogymnia was thought to be the sister genus to Menegazzia, with some authors even separating these two genera into a family of their own, the Hypogymniaceae.  However, no molecular phylogenies to date have supported this grouping.

There are three accepted subgenera within Menegazzia: Dispora, Octospora, and Megamenegazzia.  However, the monophyletic nature of these three groups remains unknown.

Characteristics

Thallus
The thallus of Menegazzia is its most distinctive feature.  It is foliose, dorsiventral, lobate, and often rosette-forming, though many species can also be irregularly spreading.  It is heteromerous, that is, it contains an upper cortex, medulla, green algal layer (occupied by Trebouxia spp.), and lower cortex.  The thallus can be loosely or closely attached to the substrate, depending on the species. Lobes are generally hollow and inflated, with perforations throughout the corticate upper surface.  Only two species of Menegazzia are known which do not contain perforations (M. eperforata, and an as yet undescribed taxon from Papua New Guinea).  Many species can be sorediate, but only a few isidiate. Maculae are often present, especially at the lobe tips. The lower surface is also corticate, naked, and often uniformly attached to the substrate (except in M. inflata). This surface is always blackened, and without rhizines.  Internal cavities have walls which are most often white, but in some species they can be pigmented or blackened.

Apothecia
Rounded apothecia are produced along the lamina of most of the known Menegazzia species, while the others are thought to be entirely asexual (like M. nothofagi and M. globulifera).  In the taxa that do produce apothecia, they are always lecanorine, and often cupuliform. They can be sessile, but more frequently are subpedicellate to pedicellate.  The apothecial disc is concave to plane, matt to shining, or even pruinose in some taxa (like with M. dielsii), with a well-developed thalline exciple. Epithecium is pigmented, and occasionally has granular inclusions. The hymenium is always colourless. Hypothecium is chondroid, and made-up of thick-walled, conglutinated cells. Paraphyses are netted, with apical cells that are sometimes capitate, and often pigmented to some extent. Asci are 2 or 8-spored.

Spores
The ascospores are simple, colourless, ellipsoid, thick walled, with a broad range of dimensions: 20-120 × 10-50 µm.  Pycnidia, if present, are produced along the lamina, and minute, immersed, and punctiform with a dark apex. Conidia, if present, are short and bacilliform.

Chemistry
Members of the genus have a diverse chemistry, including fatty acids, depsides, depsidones, and pigments.

Ecology
Menegazzia species are most often corticolous, but several species are saxicolous, muscicolous, and/or terricolous.  This group tends to be most abundant and diverse in the southern beech (Nothofagus) forests of Australasia and South America.  Most species appear to be very slow growing, especially in dryer habitats, but more study is needed here.

Evolution
Ascus evolution in Menegazzia is of particular interest, because many species have 2-spores per ascus, while nearly all other genera in the Parmeliaceae have 8-spores (making the character likely plesiomorphic for the family).

Uses
Menegazzia does not produce any economically important products, nor is it known to have had any uses by indigenous peoples.  However, the genus is important for some small insects, which use the hollow lobes for shelter and the upper cortex for food.

Species

Image gallery

References

External links
Menegazzia at the online Flora of New Zealand - Lichens - Revised 2nd Edition (2007)
Menegazzia at the online Flora of New Zealand - Lichens (1985)
Menegazzia at the online  Checklist of the Lichens Of Australia and its Island Territories (2010)
Menegazzia at the online Encyclopedia of Life
Menegazzia gallery at Pictures of Tropical Lichens Online

 
Lecanorales genera
Lichen genera
Taxa described in 1854
Taxa named by Abramo Bartolommeo Massalongo